Beggarington Hill is a hamlet in the county of West Yorkshire, England, in the City of Leeds and at the border of Kirklees. Historically, it was part of the West Ardsley civil parish. It is located immediately southwest of West Ardsley near the town of Batley, between Baghill Beck in the north and Hey Beck in the south.

Nearby Woodkirk Mill, a corn mill, had fallen into disuse by 1930.

References

Geography of Leeds
Hamlets in West Yorkshire